Odessa-Schlemeyer Field  is an airport 5 miles northeast of Odessa, Texas, United States.

References

Airports in Texas